The Arecibo Telescope was a  spherical reflector radio telescope built into a natural sinkhole at the Arecibo Observatory located near Arecibo, Puerto Rico. Completed in November 1963, the Arecibo Telescope was the world's largest single-aperture telescope for 53 years, until it was surpassed in July 2016 by the Five-hundred-meter Aperture Spherical Telescope (FAST) in Guizhou, China.

The Arecibo Telescope was primarily used for research in radio astronomy, atmospheric science, and radar astronomy, as well as for programs that search for extraterrestrial intelligence (SETI). Scientists wanting to use the observatory submitted proposals that were evaluated by independent scientific referees. NASA also used the telescope for near-Earth object detection programs. The observatory, funded primarily by the National Science Foundation (NSF) with partial support from NASA, was managed by Cornell University from its completion in 1963 until 2011, after which it was transferred to a partnership led by SRI International. In 2018, a consortium led by the University of Central Florida assumed operation of the facility.

The telescope's unique and futuristic design led to several appearances in film, gaming and television productions, such as for the climactic fight scene in the James Bond film GoldenEye (1995). It is one of the 116 pictures included in the Voyager Golden Record. It has been listed on the US National Register of Historic Places since 2008. The center was named an IEEE Milestone in 2001.

Since 2006, the NSF has reduced its funding commitment to the observatory, leading academics to push for additional funding support to continue its programs. The telescope was damaged by Hurricane Maria in 2017 and was affected by earthquakes in 2019 and 2020. Two cable breaks, one in August 2020 and a second in November 2020, threatened the structural integrity of the support structure for the suspended platform and damaged the dish. Due to uncertainty over the remaining strength of the other cables supporting the suspended structure, and the risk of collapse owing to further failures making repairs dangerous, the NSF announced on November 19, 2020, that the telescope would be decommissioned and dismantled, with the radio telescope and LIDAR facility remaining operational. Before it could be decommissioned, several of the remaining support cables suffered a critical failure and the support structure, antenna, and dome assembly all fell into the dish at 7:55 a.m. local time on December 1, 2020, destroying the telescope. The NSF determined that it would not rebuild the telescope or similar Observatory at the site in October 2022.

General information 

The telescope's main collecting dish had the shape of a spherical cap  in diameter with an  radius of curvature, and was constructed inside a karst sinkhole. The ground beneath supported shade-tolerant vegetation.

The telescope had three radar transmitters, with effective isotropic radiated powers (EIRPs) of 22 TW (continuous) at 2380 MHz, 3.2 TW (pulse peak) at 430 MHz, and 200 MW at 47 MHz, as well as an ionospheric modification facility operating at 5.1 and 8.175 MHz.

The dish remained stationary, while receivers and transmitters were moved to the proper focal point of the telescope to aim at the desired target. As a spherical mirror, the reflector's focus is along a line rather than at one point. As a result, complex line feeds were implemented to carry out observations, with each line feed covering a narrow frequency band measuring 10–45 MHz. A limited number of line feeds could be used at any one time, limiting the telescope's flexibility.

Each main cable was a  diameter bundle containing 160 wires, with the bundle painted over and dry air continuously blown through to prevent corrosion due to the humid tropic climate. This allowed the telescope to observe any region of the sky in a forty-degree cone of visibility about the local zenith (between −1 and 38 degrees of declination). Puerto Rico's location near the Northern Tropic allowed the Arecibo telescope to view the planets in the Solar System over the northern half of their orbit. The round trip light time to objects beyond Saturn is longer than the 2.6-hour time that the telescope could track a celestial position, preventing radar observations of more distant objects.

History

Design and construction 

The origins of the observatory trace to late 1950s efforts to develop anti-ballistic missile (ABM) defenses as part of the newly formed United States Department of Defense (DoD) Advanced Research Projects Agency (ARPA) ABM umbrella-effort, Project Defender.

Among the many Defender projects were several studies based on the concept that a re-entering nuclear warhead would cause unique physical signatures while still in the upper atmosphere. It was known that hot, high-speed objects caused ionization of the atmosphere that reflects radar waves, and it appeared that a warhead's signature would be different enough from decoys that a detector could pick out the warhead directly, or alternately, provide added information that would allow operators to focus a conventional tracking radar on the single return from the warhead.

Although the concept appeared to offer a solution to the tracking problem, there was almost no information on either the physics of re-entry or a strong understanding of the normal composition of the upper layers of the ionosphere. ARPA began to address both simultaneously. To better understand the radar returns from a warhead, several radars were built on Kwajalein Atoll, while Arecibo started with the dual purpose of understanding the ionosphere's F-layer while also producing a general-purpose scientific radio observatory.

The observatory was built between mid-1960 and November 1963. William E. Gordon and George Peter of Cornell University oversaw its design for study of the Earth's ionosphere. He was attracted to the sinkholes in the karst regions of Puerto Rico that offered perfect cavities for a very large dish. Originally, a fixed parabolic reflector was envisioned, pointing in a fixed direction with a  tower to hold equipment at the focus. This design would have limited its use in other research areas, such as radar astronomy, radio astronomy and atmospheric science, which require the ability to point at different positions in the sky and track those positions for an extended time as the Earth rotates.

Ward Low of the ARPA pointed out this flaw and put Gordon in touch with the Air Force Cambridge Research Laboratory (AFCRL) in Boston, Massachusetts, where one group headed by Phil Blacksmith was working on spherical reflectors and another group was studying the propagation of radio waves in and through the upper atmosphere. Cornell University proposed the project to ARPA in mid-1958 and a contract was signed between the AFCRL and the University in November 1959. The RFP suggested a tripod or a tower in the center to support the feed. On the day the project for the design and construction of the antenna was announced at Cornell University, Gordon had also envisioned a  tower centered in the  reflector to support the feed.

The suspended structure was designed by Dr. Thomas C. Kavanagh, Fred Severud, and Dr. Hans Bandel, who were selected after the 1959 RFP issued by Cornell University. A proposal by General Bronze Corporation was not selected as it did not meet specifications, according to an editorial response by Donald Cooke (Cornell’s spokesperson) to Helias Doundoulakis in a newsletter of the Institute of Electrical and Electronics Engineers (IEEE). Cooke stated that Doundoulakis used an incorrect feed/paraxial surface measurement. However, the measurement Cooke used was from Doundoulakis’ patent issued in 1966, and not from the 1959 RFP meetings which predated the patent by seven years. Furthermore, proposal measurements presented by George Doundoulakis and Helias Doundoulakis at the RFP meeting on December 10, 1959, were not referenced in Cooke’s editorial response. The originators of this proposal subsequently filed a dispute, originally for $1.2 million but was settled for $10,000 because "the defense in a court trial would cost far more than the $10,000 for which the case was settled," and accordingly, on April 11, 1975, Doundoulakis v. U.S. (Case 412-72) had been ruled in plaintiff's favor by the United States Court of Federal Claims, that “(a) a judgment has been entered in favor of the plaintiffs (Helias Doundoulakis, William J. Casey, and Constantine Michalos) against the United States and (b) in consideration of the sum of $10,000 to be paid by the United States Government to the plaintiff, the plaintiffs grants to the United States Government an irrevocable, fully-paid, non-exclusive license under the aforesaid U.S. Patent No. 3, 273, 156 to Cornell University.” 
George Doundoulakis, who directed research at General Bronze Corporation in Garden City, New York, along with Zachary Sears, who directed Internal Design at Digital B & E Corporation, New York, received the RFP from Cornell University for the antenna design and studied the idea of suspending the feed with his brother, Helias Doundoulakis, a civil engineer. George Doundoulakis identified the problem that a tower or tripod would have presented around the center, (the most important area of the reflector), and devised a better design by suspending the feed. He presented his proposal to Cornell University for a doughnut or torus-type truss suspended by four cables from four towers above the reflector, having along its edge a rail track for the azimuthal truss positioning. This second truss, in the form of an arc, or arch, was to be suspended below, which would rotate on the rails through 360 degrees. The arc also had rails on which the unit supporting the feed would move for the feed's elevational positioning. A counterweight would move symmetrically opposite to the feed for stability and, if a hurricane struck, the whole feed could be raised and lowered. Helias Doundoulakis designed the cable suspension system which was finally adopted. The present configuration is substantially the same as in the original drawings by George and Helias Doundoulakis, although with three towers, instead of the four drawn in the patent, which was granted to Helias Doundoulakis by the U.S. Patent office. The idea of a spherical reflecting mirror with a steerable secondary has since been used in optical telescopes, in particular, the Hobby–Eberly Telescope

Construction began in mid-1960, with the telescope operational about three years later. The telescope's and the supporting observatory's official opening as the Arecibo Ionospheric Observatory (AIO) was held on November 1, 1963.

Upgrades 
Since its construction, the telescope was upgraded several times, following the facility's oversight from the DoD to the National Science Foundation on October 1, 1969, and subsequent renaming of the AIO to the National Astronomy and Ionosphere Center (NAIC) in September 1971. Initially, when the maximum expected operating frequency was about 500 MHz, the surface consisted of half-inch galvanized wire mesh laid directly on the support cables. In 1973, a high-precision surface consisting of 38,000 individually adjustable aluminum panels replaced the old wire mesh, and the highest usable frequency rose to about 5000 MHz. A Gregorian reflector system was installed in 1997, incorporating secondary and tertiary reflectors to focus radio waves at one point. This allowed installing a suite of receivers, covering the full 1–10 GHz range, that could be easily moved to the focal point, giving Arecibo more flexibility. The additional instrumentation added  to the platform, so six additional support cables were added, two for each tower. A metal mesh screen was also installed around the perimeter to block the ground's thermal radiation from reaching the feed antennas. In 1997, a more powerful 2400 MHz transmitter was added. The HF facility consisted on the sender side of six foldable 100 kW crossed dipoles inside the main dish and a hanging 100m wide subreflector mesh between the dish and platform.

Funding reductions 
The Astronomical Sciences and Atmospheric Sciences divisions of the NSF had financially supported Arecibo since its completion in the 1970s, with incremental support by NASA, for operating the planetary radar. Between 2001 and 2006, NASA decreased, then eliminated, its support of the planetary radar.

The report further stated that if other sources of funding could not be found, closure of the Observatory was recommended.

Academics and researchers responded by organizing to protect and advocate for the observatory. They established the Arecibo Science Advocacy Partnership (ASAP) in 2008, to advance the scientific excellence of Arecibo Observatory research and to publicize its accomplishments in astronomy, aeronomy and planetary radar as to seek additional funding support for the observatory. An additional  in bonds were secured from the government of Puerto Rico. Academics, media and influential politicians pressured the United States Congress on the importance of the work of the observatory. led to additional  in funding to support Arecibo in the American Recovery and Reinvestment Act of 2009. This was used for basic maintenance and for a second, much smaller, antenna to be used for very long baseline interferometry, new Klystron amplifiers for the planetary radar system and student training.

Arecibo's budget from NSF continued to wane in the following years. Starting in FY2010, NASA restored its historical support by contributing $2.0 million per year for planetary science, particularly the study of near-Earth objects, at Arecibo. NASA implemented this funding through its Near Earth Object Observations program. NASA increased its support to $3.5 million per year in 2012.

In 2011, NSF removed Cornell University, which had managed the National Astronomy and Ionosphere Center (NAIC) since the 1970s, as the operator and transferred these responsibilities to SRI International, along with two other managing partners, Universities Space Research Association and Universidad Metropolitana de Puerto Rico, with a number of other collaborators. NSF also decertified NAIC as a Federally Funded Research and Development Center (FFRDC), which the NSF said would give NAIC greater freedom to establish broader scientific partnerships and pursue funding opportunities for activities beyond the scope of those supported by NSF.

While the Observatory continued to operate under the reduced NSF budget and NASA funds, NSF signaled in 2015 and 2016 that it was looking towards potential decommissioning of the Observatory by initiating environmental impact statements on the effect of deconstructing the unit. The NSF continued to indicate it would like to reduce funding to the Observatory in the near future. As in 2008, academics expressed their concern over the loss of scientific discoveries that could occur should the Observatory be shut down.

2020 damage, decommissioning plans, and collapse 

Several hurricanes and storms over the 2010s had raised the concerns of structural engineers over the stability of the observatory. On September 21, 2017, high winds associated with Hurricane Maria caused the 430 MHz line feed to break and fall onto the primary dish, damaging roughly 30 of the 38,000 aluminum panels. Most Arecibo observations did not use the line feed but instead relied on the feeds and receivers located in the dome. Overall, the damage inflicted by Maria was minimal, but it further clouded the observatory's future. Restoring all the previous capabilities required more than the observatory's already-threatened operating budget, and users feared the decision would be made to decommission it instead.

A consortium consisting of the University of Central Florida (UCF), Yang Enterprises and UMET, came forward to supply funding in February 2018 to allow the NSF to reduce its contribution towards Arecibo's operating costs from $8 million to $2 million from the fiscal year 2022–2023, thus securing the observatory's future. With this, the UCF consortium were named the new operators of the observatory in 2018.

On August 10, 2020, an auxiliary platform support cable separated from Tower 4, causing damage to the telescope, including a  gash in the reflector dish. Damage included six to eight panels in the Gregorian dome, and to the platform used to access the dome. No one was reported to have been hurt by the partial collapse. The facility was closed as damage assessments were made.

The facility had recently reopened following the passing of Tropical Storm Isaias. It was unclear if the cable failure was caused by Isaias. Former Arecibo Observatory director Robert Kerr stated that prior to the 1997 installation of the Gregorian dome, the main support cables and support towers had been engineered with a safety factor of two, as to be able to sustain twice the weight of the platform. When the dome was added in 1997, the auxiliary cables were intended to retain the safety factor of two once all design factors were considered, but Kerr believed that that was never the case as evenly distributing the loads following that install would be difficult to do. Kerr also stated that there had been periods of neglect at the Observatory, during which the fans that were used to blow dry air along the wire bundles were not operating. The earlier storms would have brought seawater to the cables which could accelerate the rate of corrosion as well, according to Kerr. Engineering firms hired by UCF inspected the socket area where the cable had failed, and found a similar problem that had been observed in the 1980s during a routine cable replacement, in which the use of molten zinc to affix the cable to the socket mount at the tower was not complete, allowing moisture to get into the wire bundle and cause corrosion and leading to the cable slipping from its socket. The firms had developed models of the telescope that showed that the safety factor for Tower 4 had dropped to 1.67, believing that the structure was still safe while repairs could be effected, even if another cable collapsed.

Before repairs could be started, on November 7, 2020, one of the two main support cables from Tower 4 snapped, shattering part of the dish itself as it fell. The UCF engineering staff, which had been monitoring the cables with support from the U.S. Army Corps of Engineers, and the engineering firms they had hired previously evaluated the remaining cables from Tower 4. One engineering firm proposed stabilization efforts, while another suggested that they try to sever parts of the instrument platform such as the Gregorian dome to reduce the load. The third firm made the determination that there was no way to safely repair the damage at this point, as the remaining cables could be suspect, and furthermore that a controlled decommissioning of the telescope was the only effective means to avoid catastrophic failure which would threaten the other buildings on campus. The NSF took this advice and made the announcement on November 19, 2020 that they would decommission Arecibo over the following few weeks after determining the safest route to do so with a safety exclusion zone immediately put in place. NSF's Sean Jones stated, "This decision is not an easy one for NSF to make, but safety of people is our number one priority." The lidar facility will remain operational.

While waiting for NSF to make the decommissioning plans, steps had been taken to try to reduce the load that each of the towers were carrying, including reducing the strain on the backstay support cables for the individual towers. Other plans, such as having helicopters hoisting part of the load while hovering above the telescope, were proposed but deemed too risky. Engineers from UCF had been monitoring the telescope and observed that wires in the backstay cables for the support towers had been breaking at a rate of one or two a day, and estimated that the telescope would soon collapse. In the weekend prior to December 1, 2020, wire strands in the receiver's supporting cables had also been snapping apart at a rapid rate, according to Ángel Vázquez, the director of operations. This culminated in the collapse of the receiver platform at around 6:55 a.m. AST (10:55 UTC) on December 1, 2020, as the second main cable from Tower 4 failed with the other two remaining support cables failing moments later. The collapse of the receiver structure and cables onto the dish caused extensive additional damage. As the receiver fell, it also sheared the tips of the towers which the support cables ran through. Once the main cables from Tower 4 released, the backstay cables, which normally balanced the horizontal component of force from the main cables, pulled the tower outwards and broke off the top. The other two towers, once the force of supporting the platform was released, also had their tips sheared off due to the backstay cable tension. The top of Tower 12 caused some structural damage to other buildings on the observatory as it fell. No injuries from the collapse were reported.

Post-collapse

In the weeks following Arecibo's collapse, the administration of the Five-hundred-metre Aperture Spherical Telescope (FAST) in China, which had drawn some design principles from Arecibo, stated that they would start taking applications for international researchers to use the telescope starting in 2021.

In late December 2020, Wanda Vázquez Garced, then governor of Puerto Rico signed an executive order for $8 million for the removal of debris and for the design of a new observatory to be built in its place. The governor stated reconstruction of the observatory is a "matter of public policy". The executive order also designated the area as a history site. 

As required by the Consolidated Appropriations Act, 2021, the NSF sent a report to Congress in March 2022 "on the causes and extent of the damage, the plan to remove debris in a safe and environmentally sound way, the preservation of the associated [Arecibo Observatory] facilities and surrounding areas, and the process for determining whether to establish comparable technology at the site, along with any associated cost estimates".  On March 25, 2022, a survey salvage committee formed by UCF and the NSF issued a final report, identifying materials from the site that may be salvaged for their "historic importance or scientific utility."

A team from the University of Texas at Austin was able to completely recover and back up the 3 petabytes of data that the telescope had captured since opening in the 1960s by May 2021 before further harm could come to the storage equipment. The data was relocated to the school's servers at the Texas Advanced Computing Center to be made available for continued research.

An early plan developed by NSF scientists suggest one possible replacement called the Next Generation Arecibo Telescope, using 1000 closely-packed  telescopes mounted on one or more flat plate(s) that would cover the  width of the Arecibo sinkhole. While the telescopes themselves would be fixed, the plate(s) would be able to be rotated more than 45° off the horizontal in any direction. This would allow the new instrument to have 500 times the field of view compared to the original Arecibo Telescope, and be twice as sensitive with four times the radar power. This would enable better study of the supermassive black hole at the center of the Milky Way as a prime target.

NSF determined in October 2022 that the Arecibo site will not be used for a new telescope, instead converting the site to be a STEM educational center.

The Arecibo Salvage Survey committee preserved some parts of the telescope, including parts of the zenith and azimuth tracks, a corner of the platform, the rotary joint, and the cable car.

Research and discoveries 

Many scientific discoveries were made with the observatory. On April 7, 1964, soon after it began operating, Gordon Pettengill's team used it to determine that the rotation period of Mercury was not 88 days, as formerly thought, but only 59 days. In 1968, the discovery of the periodicity of the Crab Pulsar (33 milliseconds) by Richard V. E. Lovelace and others provided the first solid evidence that neutron stars exist. In 1974, Hulse and Taylor discovered the first binary pulsar PSR B1913+16, an accomplishment for which they later received the Nobel Prize in Physics. In 1982, the first millisecond pulsar, PSR B1937+21, was discovered by Donald C. Backer, Shrinivas Kulkarni, Carl Heiles, Michael Davis, and Miller Goss. This object spins 642 times per second and, until the discovery of PSR J1748-2446ad in 2005, was identified as the fastest-spinning pulsar.

In 1980, Arecibo made the first radar observation of a comet when it successfully detected Comet Encke. In August 1989, the observatory directly imaged an asteroid for the first time in history: 4769 Castalia. The following year, Polish astronomer Aleksander Wolszczan made the discovery of pulsar PSR B1257+12, which later led him to discover its three orbiting planets. These were the first extrasolar planets discovered. In 1994, John Harmon used the Arecibo Radio Telescope to map the distribution of ice in the polar regions of Mercury.

In January 2008, detection of prebiotic molecules methanimine and hydrogen cyanide were reported from the observatory's radio spectroscopy measurements of the distant starburst galaxy Arp 220.

From January 2010 to February 2011, astronomers Matthew Route and Aleksander Wolszczan detected bursts of radio emission from the T6.5 brown dwarf 2MASS J10475385+2124234. This was the first time that radio emission had been detected from a T dwarf, which has methane absorption lines in its atmosphere. It is also the coolest brown dwarf (at a temperature of ~900K) from which radio emission has been observed. The highly polarized and highly energetic radio bursts indicated that the object has a >1.7 kG-strength magnetic field and magnetic activity similar to both the planet Jupiter and the Sun.

The Arecibo message 

In 1974, the Arecibo message, an attempt to communicate with potential extraterrestrial life, was transmitted from the radio telescope toward the globular cluster Messier 13, about 25,000 light-years away. The 1,679 bit pattern of 1s and 0s defined a 23 by 73 pixel bitmap image that included numbers, stick figures, chemical formulas and a crude image of the telescope.

SETI and METI projects 

Search for extraterrestrial intelligence (SETI) is the search for extraterrestrial life or advanced technologies. SETI aims to answer the question "Are we alone in the Universe?" by scanning the skies for transmissions from intelligent civilizations elsewhere in our galaxy.

In comparison, METI (messaging to extraterrestrial intelligence) refers to the active search by transmitting messages.

Arecibo is the source of data for the SETI@home and Astropulse distributed computing projects put forward by the Space Sciences Laboratory at the University of California, Berkeley, and was used for the SETI Institute's Project Phoenix observations. The Einstein@Home distributed computing project has found more than 20 pulsars in Arecibo data.

Other uses 
Terrestrial aeronomy experiments at Arecibo have included the Coqui 2 experiment, supported by NASA. The telescope also originally had military intelligence uses, including locating Soviet radar installations by detecting their signals bouncing off the Moon.

Limited amateur radio operations have occurred, using moon bounce or Earth–Moon–Earth communication, in which radio signals aimed at the Moon are reflected back to Earth. The first of these operations was on June 13–14, 1964, using the call KP4BPZ. A dozen or so two-way contacts were made on 144 and 432 MHz. On July 3 and 24, 1965, KP4BPZ was again activated on 432 MHz, making approximately 30 contacts on 432 MHz during the limited time slots available. For these tests, a very wide-band instrumentation recorder captured a large segment of the receiving bandwidth, enabling later verification of other amateur station callsigns. These were not two-way contacts. From April 16–18, 2010, again, the Arecibo Amateur Radio Club KP4AO conducted moon-bounce activity using the antenna. On November 10, 2013, the KP4AO Arecibo Amateur Radio Club conducted a Fifty-Year Commemoration Activation, lasting seven hours on 14.250 MHz SSB, without using the main dish antenna.

Cultural significance 
Due to its unique shape and concept, the telescope had been featured in many contemporary works. It was used as a filming location in the films GoldenEye (1995), Species (1995), and Contact (1997) (based on Carl Sagan's novel of the same name, which also featured the observatory), The Losers (2010), and in The X-Files television episode "Little Green Men". One map in the 2013 video game Battlefield 4, while set in China, is based on the distinctive layout of the Arecibo Telescope. In 2014, a video art installation piece titled The Great Silence by artists Jennifer Allora and Guillermo Calzadilla in collaboration with science fiction writer Ted Chiang featured the radio telescope at Arecibo Observatory to represent the search for extraterrestrial life. The next year, Chiang published a novelette also called The Great Silence. The juxtaposed text was later published as a short story with the same title in a special issue of the art journal e-flux in 2015 and was included in the author's short story collection Exhalation: Stories in 2019.

The asteroid 4337 Arecibo is named after the observatory by Steven J. Ostro, in recognition of the observatory's contributions to the characterization of Solar System bodies.

See also 
 List of radio telescopes
 Orgov Radio-Optical Telescope

References

Further reading 
 
 
 
 
 
 
Entry into the National Register of Historic Places

External links 

 
 Youtube video of collapse 12.56 mins
 The wondrous life—and dramatic death—of Puerto Rico's Arecibo Observatory

1963 establishments in Puerto Rico
2020 disestablishments in Puerto Rico
National Register of Historic Places in Arecibo, Puerto Rico
Buildings and structures completed in 1963
Building collapses in 2020
Historic districts on the National Register of Historic Places in Puerto Rico
Historic Mechanical Engineering Landmarks
Museums in Arecibo, Puerto Rico
National Science Foundation
Radio telescopes
Science museums in Puerto Rico
Search for extraterrestrial intelligence
2020 in science